Robert Breckinridge may refer to:

 Robert Jefferson Breckinridge (1800–1871), American politician and Presbyterian minister
 Robert Jefferson Breckinridge Jr. (1833–1915), Confederate Congressman and colonel in the Confederate Army

See also
 Robert B. McAfee (Robert Breckinridge McAfee, 1784–1849), Kentucky diplomat, historian and politician